The following is a current list of programs broadcast by the Canadian TV channel Slice, and its former incarnation as Life Network.

Current programming

Original programming
Big Brother Canada
 Ex-Wives of Rock
 Money Moron
Princess
Til Debt Do Us Part
Unusually Thicke

Acquired programming
48 Hours Mystery
 Beautiful People
Big Brother: After Dark
Border Security: Canada's Front Line
Entertainment Tonight Canada
Face to Face with David
 Friends
 Karma's A B*tch
Million Dollar Listing Miami
Million Dollar Listing New York
The Millionaire Matchmaker
Mob Wives
Murder in Paradise
Online Dating Rituals of the American Male
Property Virgins
The Real Housewives of Atlanta
The Real Housewives of Beverly Hills
The Real Housewives of Miami
The Real Housewives of Melbourne
The Real Housewives of New Jersey
The Real Housewives of New York City
The Real Housewives of Orange County
 See No Evil
The Singles Project
Southern Charm
A Stranger in My Home
Surviving Evil

Past programming

Original programming
At the End of My Leash
Birth Days
Brides of Beverly Hills
Bulging Brides
Cake Walk
Cake Walk: Wedding Cake Edition
Carlawood
Child Star
Crash Test Mommy
 Dogs with Jobs
Dr. in the House
 Extreme Collectors
Four Weddings Canada
Intervention Canada
The Last 10 Pounds Bootcamp
The List
 Lost and Sold
Marriage Under Construction
Matchmaker
 The Mistress 
 Mother of the Bride
 My Teenage Wedding 
Outlaw In-Laws
Project Runway Canada
The Real Housewives of TorontoThe Real Housewives of VancouverRenovate My WardrobeRich Bride, Poor BrideRich Groom, Poor GroomRocker MomsThree TakesU8TV: The LoftersWedding SOSX-WeightedAcquired programming
 72 HoursAverage JoeBethenny Ever After...Bethenny Getting Married?Big City BrokerThe Biggest LoserBuy MeCanada Sings Casino ConfidentialCelebrity Paranormal ProjectDance MomsThe Ex-Wives ClubThe Glee Project The HeroI Do, Let's Eat Kendra on TopKing of the NerdsKitchen NightmaresThe Mom ShowNewlywed, Nearly DeadOne Born Every MinuteParty MamasProperty ShopThe Real Housewives of DCSupernannyTabatha Takes OverTabatha's Salon TakeoversTim Gunn's Guide To StyleTori & Dean: Home Sweet HollywoodTori & Dean: Inn LoveTori & Dean: sTORIbook WeddingsTrading Spouses''

References

Slice